The following are lists of Canadian game shows, arranged by language:

List of English-language Canadian game shows
List of French-language Canadian game shows